Jay is a town in Santa Rosa County, Florida, United States. The population was 533 at the 2010 census. As of 2018, the population estimated by the U.S. Census Bureau was 620. It is part of the Pensacola–Ferry Pass–Brent Metropolitan Statistical Area.

History

In 1902, a committee was formed to select a name for the thriving farming community. James Thomas Nowling submitted the name "Pine Level" but it was declined due to a Florida post office already using it. Mr. Nowling was asked to submit a second name and was turned down again due to the name being too long. He was asked to submit yet another name but the Postal Department named the new post office after Mr. Nowling before he was able to submit another name and Mr. Nowling became the first postmaster of Jay.

A small group of farmers began a livestock market in 1940 and reached sales of up to $1 million within 10 years. Oil was discovered here in 1970. The Jay oilfield has approximately 67 oilwells - eleven within the town limits. Royalties from the oil have exceeded $400 million that funded a new city hall, fire department and recreation complex.

Geography

The town lies on high ground on the east bank of the Escambia River. There are two river access points/boat ramps, both outside the city limits.

Demographics

As of the census of 2010, there were 553 people, 230 households, and 147 families residing in the town. The racial makeup of the town was 97.58% White, 0.35% African American, 1.21% Native American, 0.17% Asian, and 0.69% from two or more races. Hispanic or Latino of any race were 1.90% of the population.

There were 230 households, out of which 31.3% had children under the age of 18 living with them, 45.7% were married couples living together, 12.6% had a female householder with no husband present, and 35.7% were non-families. 31.7% of all households were made up of individuals, and 13.0% had someone living alone who was 65 years of age or older.  The average household size was 2.43 and the average family size was 3.07.

In the town, the population was spread out, with 24.5% under the age of 18, 7.3% from 18 to 24, 25.2% from 25 to 44, 26.8% from 45 to 64, and 16.2% who were 65 years of age or older.  The median age was 40 years. For every 100 females, there were 91.7 males.  For every 100 females age 18 and over, there were 86.8 males.

The median income for a household in the town was $23,500, and the median income for a family was $40,250. Males had a median income of $26,719 versus $21,500 for females. The per capita income for the town was $13,949.  About 13.8% of families and 16.5% of the population were below the poverty line, including 23.9% of those under age 18 and 12.9% of those age 65 or over.

Industry

Jay is a farming community, with cotton, soybeans, peanuts and hay being major crops.  Jay is also the site of the giant Jay oil field, which has produced over 330 million barrels since its discovery in 1970, but is now toward the end of its producing life. A small refinery is located off State Road 4. The refinery has had several owners since the 1970s—Exxon sold the refinery to Quantum Resources Management LLC  March 2004. In January 2009, Quantum announced that they were ceasing production at the facility due to poor economics, and has terminated roughly half of the plant employees. Quantum resumed production shortly thereafter when oil prices increased.

Recreation

Jay is home to the Jay Peanut Festival, held each Autumn, and also hosts several local rodeo events. For the last three years (2004–2007) the 4th of July celebration has been headlined by country singer Eric Agnew from Nashville, Tenn. The nearby Escambia River provides fishing opportunities, and both the Escambia River WMA and the Blackwater State Forest provide public, licensed hunting.

Services

Jay has a combined elementary and middle school (grades K–6), and a combined middle-high school (grades 7–12).  There are several banks and credit unions.  There is one grocery store and one traffic light.  The nearest Walmart stores are in Brewton, Alabama or Pace, Fla.  There are several private airstrips, and the nearest commercial-service passenger airport is the Pensacola International Airport (approximately 40 miles SSW).

Jay Hospital is a 55-bed general hospital located in northern Santa Rosa County serving the residents of Jay and the surrounding areas of Century, Flomaton and beyond in the northwest Florida-south Alabama region.

Notable people

 Brian Girard James, professional wrestler also known as "The Road Dogg" Jesse James
 Jackie Moore, Major League Baseball Manager, coach and player. Managed the Oakland Athletics 1984–1986
 Thomas Brent "Boo" Weekley, golfer

Climate

Climate is characterized by relatively high temperatures and evenly distributed precipitation throughout the year.  The Köppen Climate Classification sub-type for this climate is "Cfa" (Humid Subtropical Climate).

References

External links
 Official site for the Town of Jay
 Jay, Florida CityTownInfo.com
 Jay Hospital- Hospital located in Jay, Florida

Towns in Santa Rosa County, Florida
Towns in Pensacola metropolitan area
Towns in Florida
1902 establishments in Florida